Belarus participated in the Eurovision Song Contest 2018 with the song "Forever" written by Kirill Pavlov and Yevgeny Matyushenko. The song was performed by Alekseev. The Belarusian entry for the 2018 contest in Lisbon, Portugal was selected through a national final organised by the Belarusian broadcaster National State Television and Radio Company of the Republic of Belarus (BTRC). The national final consisted of fifteen competing acts participating in a televised production where "Forever" performed by Alekseev was selected as the winner following the combination of votes from a jury panel and public televoting.

Belarus was drawn to compete in the first semi-final of the Eurovision Song Contest which took place on 8 May 2018. Performing during the show in position 8, "Forever" was not announced among the top 10 entries of the first semi-final and therefore did not qualify to compete in the final. It was later revealed that Belarus placed sixteenth out of the 19 participating countries in the semi-final with 65 points.

Background 

Prior to the 2018 contest, Belarus had participated in the Eurovision Song Contest fourteen times since its first entry in 2004. The nation's best placing in the contest was sixth, which it achieved in 2007 with the song "Work Your Magic" performed by Koldun. In 2016, Belarus failed to qualify to the final with the song "Help You Fly" performed by Ivan. In 2017, Belarus qualified to the final and placed seventeenth with the song "Story of My Life" performed by Naviband.

The Belarusian national broadcaster, National State Television and Radio Company of the Republic of Belarus (BTRC), broadcasts the event within Belarus and organises the selection process for the nation's entry. The broadcaster has used both internal selections and national finals to select the Belarusian entry for Eurovision in the past. Since 2012, BTRC has organised a national final in order to choose Belarus' entry, a selection procedure that will continue for their 2018 entry.

Before Eurovision

National final
The Belarusian national final took place on 16 February 2018. Ten songs participated in the competition and the winner was selected through a jury and public televote. The show was broadcast on Belarus 1, Belarus 24 and Radius FM as well as online via the broadcaster's official website tvr.by.

Competing entries
Artists and composers were able to submit their applications and entries to the broadcaster between 1 December 2017 and 26 December 2017. At the closing of the deadline, 95 entries were received by the broadcaster. Auditions were held on 11 January 2018 at the BTRC "600 Metrov" studio where a jury panel was tasked with selecting up to fifteen entries to proceed to the televised national final. The auditions were webcast online at the official BTRC website. The jury consisted of Valery Dayneko (chairman of the jury, singer), Olga Salamakha (deputy director of the TV channel Belarus 1), Andrey Kalina (director of the Music Production Center), Victoria Aleshko (singer), Olga Vronskaya (artist of the Youth Theatre), Ekaterina Dulova (rector of BGAE), Tatyana Parhamovich (deputy head of the department of professional art of the Ministry of Culture of Belarus), Elena Treschinskaya (head of the radio station "Radius FM"), Denis Dudinsky (television host and singer), Grigor Abalyan (owner of the First Concert company), Natalia Tambovtseva (composer), Sergey Malinovsky (journalist) and Alexander Chernukho (journalist). Eleven finalists were selected and announced on 11 January 2018. 

Following the announcement of the finalists, it emerged that "Forever" had been performed by Alekseev in Russian at several concerts before 1 September 2017; Alekseev was ultimately allowed to participate after changes to the song's melody were made. On 16 January 2018, "Gravity", written by Leo Vasilets and to have been performed by Sofi Lapina, was withdrawn from the competition. On 17 January 2018, it emerged that the participation of Shuma was being investigated as "Hmarki" contained lyrics from a traditional Belarusian folk song; the band was ultimately allowed to participate after adjusting the song lyrics.

Final
The televised final took place on 16 February 2018 at the "600 Metrov" studio in Minsk, hosted by Olga Ryzhikova and 2014 Belarusian Eurovision contestant Teo. Prior to the competition, a draw for the running order took place on 16 January 2018. A 50/50 combination of votes from nine jury members made up of music professionals and public televoting selected the song "Forever" performed by Alekseev as the winner. The jury consisted of Elena Treschinskaya (head of the radio station "Radius FM"), Alexander Kapenkin (director of the TV channel TV BelMuz), Olga Salamakha (deputy director of the TV channel Belarus 1), Tatyana Parkhimovich (deputy head of the Belarusian Ministry of Culture), Aleks David (singer-songwriter), Andrey Kalina (producer), Sergey Malinovsky (journalist), Igor Melnikov (vocal coach) and Alexander Chernukho (journalist).

In addition to the performances from the competitors, the show featured guest performances by 2017 Belarusian Eurovision contestant Naviband, Violetta Baginskaya, Angelina Pipper, Ivan Zdonyuk, Angelica Pushnova, Elizaveta Muravera, July, Michael Soul and Beatrees.

Controversy 
Prior to the national final, seven of the competing artists stated in an open letter to BTRC that they would withdraw from the competition if Alekseev was not disqualified, also adding that they believe the show was being rigged for him to win. All artists except Sofi Lapina, who withdrew in protest of BTRC blocking several of her participating songs that have been released or performed before that date yet neglected to disqualify Alekseev for the same reason, ultimately remained as participants and performed at the national final. Following the show, the songwriters of "I Won't Cry", performed by Gunesh, announced that they would take legal action against BTRC and the European Broadcasting Union (EBU), the latter which approved "Forever" to still compete in the contest despite previous claims.

Promotion 
Alekseev made several appearances across Europe to specifically promote "Forever" as the Belarusian Eurovision entry. Between 8 and 11 April, Alekseev took part in promotional activities in Tel Aviv, Israel and performed during the Israel Calling event held at the Rabin Square. On 14 April, Alekseev performed during the Eurovision in Concert event which was held at the AFAS Live venue in Amsterdam, Netherlands and hosted by Edsilia Rombley and Cornald Maas. On 21 April, Alekseev performed during the ESPreParty event which was held at the Sala La Riviera venue in Madrid, Spain and hosted by Soraya Arnelas.

At Eurovision 
According to Eurovision rules, all nations with the exceptions of the host country and the "Big Five" (France, Germany, Italy, Spain and the United Kingdom) are required to qualify from one of two semi-finals in order to compete for the final; the top ten countries from each semi-final progress to the final. The European Broadcasting Union (EBU) split up the competing countries into six different pots based on voting patterns from previous contests, with countries with favourable voting histories put into the same pot. On 29 January 2018, a special allocation draw was held which placed each country into one of the two semi-finals, as well as which half of the show they would perform in. Belarus was placed into the first semi-final, to be held on 8 May 2018, and was scheduled to perform in the first half of the show.

Once all the competing songs for the 2018 contest had been released, the running order for the semi-finals was decided by the shows' producers rather than through another draw, so that similar songs were not placed next to each other. Belarus was set to perform in position 8, following the entry from Israel and before the entry from Estonia.

The two semi-finals and the final were broadcast in Belarus on Belarus 1 and Belarus 24 with commentary by Evgeny Perlin. The Belarusian spokesperson, who announce the top 12-point score awarded by the Belarusian jury during the final, was 2017 Belarusian representative Naviband.

Semi-final

Alekseev took part in technical rehearsals on 29 April and 3 May, followed by dress rehearsals on 7 and 8 May. This included the jury show on 7 May where the professional juries of each country watched and voted on the competing entries.

The Belarusian performance featured Alekseev wearing a white shirt and black trousers, performing on stage together with a ballet dancer who wore a full length red Flamenco inspired dress. The performance began with Alekseev on a platform while singing to a red rose which he then presented to the camera. The rose was then handed to the dancer who fired it back through Alekseev's hand with a bow. The platform was later raised up from the stage, and was concluded with Alekseev turning his back showing a rose injury. The dancer that joined Alekseev was Yulia Zima-Blazhkiv, while the singer was also joined by four off-stage backing vocalists: Anna Kilchenko, Anyanya Udongwo, Valeriya Khomenko and Vilen Kilchenko.

At the end of the show, Belarus was not announced among the top 10 entries in the first semi-final and therefore failed to qualify to compete in the final. It was later revealed that Belarus placed sixteenth in the semi-final, receiving a total of 65 points: 45 points from the televoting and 20 points from the juries.

Voting
Voting during the three shows involved each country awarding two sets of points from 1-8, 10 and 12: one from their professional jury and the other from televoting. Each nation's jury consisted of five music industry professionals who are citizens of the country they represent, with their names published before the contest to ensure transparency. This jury judged each entry based on: vocal capacity; the stage performance; the song's composition and originality; and the overall impression by the act. In addition, no member of a national jury was permitted to be related in any way to any of the competing acts in such a way that they cannot vote impartially and independently. The individual rankings of each jury member as well as the nation's televoting results were released shortly after the grand final.

Below is a breakdown of points awarded to Belarus and awarded by Belarus in the first semi-final and grand final of the contest, and the breakdown of the jury voting and televoting conducted during the two shows:

Points awarded to Belarus

Points awarded by Belarus

Detailed voting results
The following members comprised the Belarusian jury:
  (jury chairperson)singer
 Alex Nabeevsinger
 Vladimir BogdanTV and radio host
 Tatsiana Parhamovichdeputy head of the Professional Arts Department of the Ministry of Culture
 producer

References

2018
Countries in the Eurovision Song Contest 2018
Eurovision